James Walton Aldridge Jr. (born November 12, 1955 in Florence, Alabama) is an American musician, singer, songwriter, engineer and record producer.

Aldridge is known primarily as a Nashville songwriter. He has written dozens of hit country songs including the Number One hits "(There's) No Gettin' Over Me" by Ronnie Milsap (1981), 'Till You're Gone by Barbara Mandrell (1982), "Holding Her and Loving You" by Earl Thomas Conley (1982), "Modern Day Bonnie and Clyde" by Travis Tritt (2000), and  "I Loved Her First" (2006) by Heartland. He is listed as a "Music Achiever" by the Alabama Music Hall of Fame, which is a precursor to future induction and has been awarded a star on their Walk of Fame.

In the late 1980s, Aldridge also sang lead vocals in the band The Shooters, a country band which charted seven singles for Epic Records.

He worked for 17 years at Fame Recording Studio in Muscle Shoals, Alabama as a producer, songwriter, and back-up musician. The studio was the subject of the 2013 documentary film Muscle Shoals.

Aldridge is an alumnus of the University of North Alabama, and has continues to teach there.

References

External links
Official web site for Walt Aldridge

1955 births
Living people
Musicians from Florence, Alabama
Country musicians from Alabama
American country singer-songwriters
Record producers from Alabama
University of North Alabama alumni
American male singer-songwriters
Singer-songwriters from Alabama